French Union of Film Critics Awards 2001
February 5, 2001
Best Film: The Gleaners & I

Best Foreign Film:Yi Yi
The winners of the 2001 French Union of Film Critics Awards are listed below.

Winners
Best Film: The Gleaners & I
Best First Film: Ressources humaines
Best Foreign Film: Yi Yi
Best Short Film: Souffle

External links
IMDB entry

French Union of Film Critics Awards
2001 film awards
2001 in French cinema
February 2001 events in France